The following is a list of clubs who have played in the EFL Championship at any time since its formation in 2004 to the current season. EFL Championship teams confirmed to be playing in the 2022–23 EFL Championship season are indicated in bold. If the longest spell is the current spell, this is indicated in bold, and if the highest finish is that of the most recent season, this is also in bold. A total of 56 teams have played in the Championship.

All statistics here refer to time in the EFL Championship only, with the exception of 'Most recent finish' which refers to all levels of play, and 'Last promotion' which refers to the club's last promotion from the third tier of English football.

Overview of clubs by season

See also
 List of Premier League clubs

References

Clubs
EFL Championship clubs
EFL Championship clubs